Caribe.Net, also known as Critical Hub Networks, is a telecommunications company that provides broadband internet access, data center and telephone services in Puerto Rico. The company is headquartered in San Juan. On April 26, 2010 the company received a $25.7 million federal award from the National Telecommunications and Information Administration for the Puerto Rico Bridge Initiative.

History 
Caribe.Net was founded in 1994 and was the first internet service provider in Puerto Rico. The company was the first to offer the following services on the island:
 Commercial internet access network
 Individual dial-up TCP/IP service
 SLIP connectivity service
 PPP connectivity
 ISDN
 v.90
 24-hour technical support
 Online subscription services
 Online account management
 LAN-based dial-up TCP/IP
 Commercial internet access to companies
 T1 and burstable T1 service
 Multi-T1 bonded service
 Private IP network (intranet/VPN)
 Virtual ISP (VSP)
 Tier 1 backbone
 ATM/Frame Relay architecture
 100% guaranteed uptime for hosting services
 Independent facilities-based ISP
 Free peering
 Guaranteed commercial quality of service (SLA)
 Colocation services
 Internet data center
 Disaster recovery services
 In-room broadband services to tourism industry (HotelAccess)
 Wireless DSL
 Off-site, off-island secure backup services

In 1999, Caribe.Net was acquired by PSINet, the largest independent facilities-based ISP in the world. In 2001, the company was acquired back by the original shareholders. Caribe.Net was also co-founder of the Internet Society of Puerto Rico and Network Access Point (NAP) of the Caribbean. In 2007, Caribe.Net teamed up with Voz to offer Enterprise-Level Telephone Services VoIP over Caribe.Net's Internet services.

In 2010, Critical Hub Networks Inc. received a $25.7 million ARRA grant through the U.S. Department of Commerce to bridge the technological divide, boost economic growth, create jobs, and improve education and health care through the improvement of broadband internet services in Puerto Rico. The project awarded is the Puerto Rico Bridge Initiative.

On February 22, 2011, Critical Hub Networks officially inaugurated the Puerto Rico Bridge Initiative, which established the PRBI Internet Exchange Point (IXP) in San Juan, Puerto Rico. Congressman Pedro Pierluisi participated in the inauguration event.

References

External links
 Caribe.Net Official Site
 Puerto Rico Bridge Initiative Official Site
 National Telecommunications and Information Administration 
 Congressman Pedro R. Pierluisi Inauguration Statement

Companies based in San Juan, Puerto Rico
Internet service providers of Puerto Rico